Jorge Eduardo Pedro Júnior (born 8 September 1994), known as Jorge Eduardo, is a Brazilian footballer who plays as a forward for lithuanian Džiugas in A Lyga.

Career
Born in São Paulo, Jorge Eduardo joined Audax São Paulo's youth setup in 2008, aged 14, and was promoted to the first-team in 2013. He made his senior debut on 20 February 2013, coming on as a second half substitute in a 3–1 home win against Velo Clube.

In November, Jorge Eduardo joined Santos FC on loan until December of the following year. After appearing regularly with the under-20's (which was crowned champions of Copa São Paulo de Futebol Júnior), he was promoted to the first-team in late January 2014.

On 25 May 2014 Jorge Eduardo made his professional debut, again from the bench in a 0–0 home draw against Flamengo. He appeared in eight league games with Peixe, but returned to Audax in January 2015, after an agreement was not reached.

After leaving Santos, Jorge Eduardo went on to represent Audax, Grêmio Osasco, Ferroviária and ABC.

Career statistics

References

External links
 

1994 births
Living people
Footballers from São Paulo
Brazilian footballers
Association football forwards
Campeonato Brasileiro Série A players
Campeonato Brasileiro Série C players
Campeonato Brasileiro Série D players
Grêmio Osasco Audax Esporte Clube players
Santos FC players
Associação Ferroviária de Esportes players
ABC Futebol Clube players
Associação Portuguesa de Desportos players
Clube Atlético Juventus players